Sergey Sviridov (born 20 October 1990 in Sverdlovsk) is a Russian decathlete. He competed in the decathlon at the 2012 Summer Olympics, finishing eighth.

International competitions

References

 
 London2012.com

1990 births
Living people
Sportspeople from Yekaterinburg
Russian decathletes
Olympic decathletes
Olympic athletes of Russia
Athletes (track and field) at the 2012 Summer Olympics
Universiade medalists in athletics (track and field)
Universiade silver medalists for Russia
Medalists at the 2013 Summer Universiade
World Athletics Championships athletes for Russia
Russian Athletics Championships winners